Ohnita Dam is a gravity dam located in Gunma Prefecture in Japan. The dam is used for flood control and water supply. The catchment area of the dam is 4.4 km2. The dam impounds about 3  ha of land when full and can store 437 thousand cubic meters of water. The construction of the dam was completed in 2001.

References

Dams in Gunma Prefecture